109th Brigade may refer to:

 109th Indian Infantry Brigade
 109th Mixed Brigade (Spain)
 109th Brigade (United Kingdom)

See also

 109th Division (disambiguation)